Steve Hartsell (born January 6, 1978, Ann Arbor, Michigan) is an American former competitive pair skater. With sister Danielle Hartsell, he is the 1999  U.S. National Champion and the 1997 World Junior Champion. After his sister retired, he skated with  Marcy Hinzmann and Kristen Roth.

Results
Men's Singles

(with Danielle Hartsell)

(with Marcy Hinzmann)

(with Kristen Roth)

References

Navigation

External links
 

1978 births
Living people
American male pair skaters
Sportspeople from Ann Arbor, Michigan
Four Continents Figure Skating Championships medalists
World Junior Figure Skating Championships medalists
20th-century American people
21st-century American people